Pastorek is a Slovenian novel.

Pastorek (Czech/Slovak feminine: Pastorková) is also a surname.
 Jozef Pastorek (born 1998), Slovak footballer